Andrey Nikolayevich Sobolyev (Russian: Андрей Николаевич Соболев; born on 1 December 1954), is a Russian political figure, who served as a member of the Federation Council from the executive body of state power of Sevastopol from 2014 to 2017.

He was the member of the Federation Council Committee on Science, Education and Culture.

He was also the deputy editor-in-chief of the weekly Sevastopolskaya Gazeta.

Biography

Andrey Sobolyev was born on 1 December 1954. He graduated from the Ukrainian Agricultural Academy with a degree in Forestry Engineering in 1990.

In 1999, in Sevastopol, he began to actively work on organizing author's song festivals. Thanks to Sobolyev, the Balaklava Holidays festival is held every summer in Balaklava.

He was a member of the Board of the Gennady Cherkashin Foundation.

He was awarded with the Order of Friendship on 22 April 2010, for a great contribution to strengthening friendship and cooperation between the peoples of  Russia and Ukraine.

On 10 October 2014, Sobolyev became the first representative of the executive body of state power of Sevastopol in the Federation Council. He was replaced by Valery Kulikov on 19 September 2017.

References

1954 births
Living people
21st-century Russian politicians
Members of the Federation Council of Russia (after 2000)